Arthur Bernard (born 1 October 1915, date of death unknown) was a Luxembourgian footballer. He played in two matches for the Luxembourg national football team from 1937 to 1939. He was also part of Luxembourg's squad for the football tournament at the 1936 Summer Olympics, but he did not play in any matches.

References

External links
 

1915 births
Year of death missing
Luxembourgian footballers
Luxembourg international footballers
Place of birth missing
Association football midfielders
CS Fola Esch players
Jeunesse Esch players